The Macedonian Second Football League (Vtora Makedonska Fudbalska Liga; also called Macedonian Second League, 2. MFL and Vtora Liga) is the second-highest professional football competition in North Macedonia.

The competition is contested by 16 clubs, playing each other 2 times over 30 rounds. At the end of the season, the winner of the league along with the 2nd placed team will gain promotion to the Macedonian First League, while the 3rd and 4th placed teams will go into a play-off against the 8th and 9th placed teams in the Macedonian First League.

2022–23 member clubs 

Arsimi
Belasica
Besa Dobri Dol
Borec
Detonit Plachkovica
Gostivar
Karaorman
Kozhuf
Lokomotiva Skopje
Ohrid
Pelister
Sasa
Sloga 1934
Teteks
Vardar
Voska Sport

Winning clubs

Note: Bold indicates clubs that was promoted to the Macedonian First League.

References

External links
Tables of the previous seasons at MacedonianFootball.com
Football Federation of Macedonia 

 
Sports leagues established in 1992
1992 establishments in the Republic of Macedonia
2
Second level football leagues in Europe